5030 may refer to:

In general
 A.D. 5030, a year in the 6th millennium CE
 5030 BCE, a year in the 6th millennium BC
 5030, a number in the 5000 (number) range

Other uses
 5030 Gyldenkerne, an asteroid in the Asteroid Belt, the 5030th asteroid registered
 Hawaii Route 5030, a state highway
 Sanyo 5030 series, an electric multiple unit train type
 Ford 5030 tractor; see List of Ford vehicles
 Nokia 5030, a cellphone, part of the Series 30

See also